Pierre Olivier Piskor (born 2 May 1984) is a French footballer.  Right-footed, Piskor currently plays as a striker for FC Differdange 03 in the Luxembourg National Division.

He won the Luxembourgian Footballer of the Year at the end of the 2008-09 season, having scored 30 goals in 26 games for Differdange in the season.

Club career
Piskor was virtually unknown until the summer of 2006, when he moved from Third Division FC Rodange 91 to Differdange.  In his first season, he finished the 2006-07 season of the National Division as the league's second-top goalscorer behind Daniel Da Mota, scoring 25 goals including five goals in an 8-0 win against FC Mamer 32.

The following season, he topped the National Division goal-scoring charts, totalling 30 goals in 26 games, and winning the Luxembourgian Footballer of the Year award: the first time a non-F91 Dudelange player had won in five years.  Qualifying for the UEFA Europe League 2nd Qualifying round in 2009–10, Piskor scored Differdange's sole goal against NK Rijeka of Croatia.  However, the following season, Piskor failed to follow up this goalscoring record, scoring eight goals in nineteen games.

Honours
 Luxembourgian Footballer of the Year - 2008-09
 Luxembourg National Division Top Scorer - 2008-09 (30 goals)
 Luxembourg Cup: 2008-2009

References

External links
 

1984 births
Living people
French footballers
Association football forwards
FC Rodange 91 players
FC Differdange 03 players
Luxembourg National Division players
French expatriate footballers
French expatriate sportspeople in Luxembourg
Expatriate footballers in Luxembourg